Neram is a 2013 Indian black comedy thriller film written, directed, and edited by Alphonse Puthren in his directorial debut. It is simultaneously made in Malayalam and Tamil languages, and it is an extended version of the short film of the same name, which he directed in 2009. It stars Nivin Pauly, Nazriya Nazim (in their Kollywood debuts) and Bobby Simha in both versions. Supporting roles were played by Manoj K. Jayan, Shammi Thilakan, Lalu Alex, and Willson Joseph in Malayalam, while Nassar, Thambi Ramiah, John Vijay and Shabareesh Varma portrayed the characters in Tamil. 

The whole film is set within one day in Chennai. Shooting for the film commenced on mid-2012, were completed in March 2013. The music was scored by debutant Rajesh Murugesan, while cinematography was handled by Anend C. Chendran. The Malayalam version was released on 10 May 2013, while the Tamil version was released a week later, on 17 May 2013. 

The film's both versions received positive reviews upon release and was a commercial success at the box-office. The film is remade in Telugu as Run starring Sundeep Kishan, Marathi as Time Bara Vait starring Bhushan Pradhan and in Kannada as Kismath (2018) starring Vijay Raghavendra. This film is about to be remade in Hindi.

Plot
Neram is about the lives of Mathew (Vetri in Tamil version) and Jeena (Veni in Tamil).

Mathew/Vetri is a computer engineering graduate but lost his job. His life is a little complicated now because he has taken a loan from a private moneylender named Vatti Raja  and is not able to repay the amount because he has no income. Jeena/Veni's father Johnykutty (Saravanar in Tamil) denies her marriage with Mathew/Vetri as he is jobless. Jeena/Veni decides to elope with Mathew/Vetri, and his friend John gives him money for paying off his debt to Raja. On their way, Jeena/Veni's chain is snatched, and Mathew/Vetri's money is stolen. Raja calls Mathew/Vetri and asks him to settle the money within 5PM.

Johnykutty/Saravanar lodges a complaint with Sub-Inspector Ukken Tintu  (Katta Kunju in Tamil) against Mathew/Vetri on charges of kidnapping Jeena/Veni and gives his number. Tintu/Katta calls Mathew/Vetri and tells him that he should come along with Jeena/Veni to the police station within 5PM, but problems are yet to come; Mathew/Vetri's brother-in-law  asks some amount of money from him to start a business (even that is scheduled for 5PM). On the other hand, Jeena/Veni is kidnapped by Raja's men, assuming her to be other man's girlfriend who also has to return money to Raja.

Mathew/Vetri comes across the same man and decides to snatch his chain, but unfortunately at the moment, he tries to snatch the chain, the man meets with an accident, and Mathew/Vetri takes him to a hospital. The man's brother RayBan (Dhandapani in Tamil), who has influence, assures Mathew/Vetri of a job in his company. Suddenly, Tintu/Katta arrives there and says that Raja died in an accident. A flashback reveals that Lighthouse, the man who stole Jeena/Veni's chain and Mathew/Vetri's money, had borrowed some money from Raja, too. He plots with two others in having the money for themselves and stealing Raja's car. While the plan works out perfectly, Raja's men went behind the car, and Raja goes behind the other man. In the chase, Raja is hit by an auto and dies. Coincidentally, the auto driver was the driver who hit RayBan's brother Manick with his vehicle, too.

Last of all, Mathew/Vetri meets the men who stole his money and involves in a brawl with them. He finds his money and a chain inside the car and also finds Jeena/Veni in the car's rear (Raja hid her in his car). Mathew/Vetri gives the money to his brother-in-law, and the movie ends with a happy note that "Time is of two types: good time and bad time. Good will come following every bad time in life".

Cast

Tamil version:
 Manobala as Doctor
 Munishkanth as Dhandapaani's sidekick
 Lakshmi as Veni's mother

Production

Development
Alphonse Puthren who made several short films and also the studio album Yuvvh had announced his directorial debut after the album's success that prompted him to move to the feature film format. He announced that the film will be titled as Neram which would be a "thriller-cum-black comedy" set in Chennai's Mandaveli, where he had lived for some time. He further added that the film's title and the story is all about the significance of time in human lives. It was considered to be an extended version of the short film of the same name starring Vijay Sethupathi, which he directed in 2009.

Casting 
Initially Puthren wrote the script with Jai and Vaibhav as the lead actors who declined the offers citing schedule conflicts. Later his friend and actor Nivin Pauly, who contributed to the short film by offering him a budget of for the project, was approached as the lead actor, marking his debut in Tamil cinema. It was Pauly's second project he signed after his breakthrough with the Malayalam film Thattathin Marayathu. Bhama was chosen as the lead actress against Pauly and had also shot for ten days, but due to her busy schedules, she was replaced by Nazriya Nazim as the lead actress, who also made her debut in Tamil with the film. Putharen decided to shoot it simultaneously in Tamil and Malayalam. He modified the Malayalam version and filmed it with an entirely different cast, retaining only the lead pair in both versions. Rajesh Murugesan, who had worked with Putharen on his short films, was chosen as the film's composer, also making his feature film debut.

Filming
The crew began filming by June 2012, which was first held across various parts of Tamil Nadu, and later in Chennai. Shooting was further carried out in Chennai in August 2012, with Bhama's portions being reshot with Nazriya. In March 2013, Putharen informed that the entire filming had been completed. The film was shot in Malayalam and in Tamil at the same time, which Pauly described as tough and challenging.

Music
Rajesh Murugesan composed the soundtrack and film score of Neram, making his feature film debut. All the songs were performed and penned by relatively new singers, along with celebrity singers Ranjith, Benny Dayal and Haricharan. A promotional song titled "Pistah" performed by Shabareesh Varma, was released on 31 March 2013 and went viral. The song's meaningless lyrics were taken from a comedy track from Sathyan Anthikkad's film Kinnaram (1983), featuring Jagathy Sreekumar. Nivin Pauly stated that the song was a tribute to Sreekumar, who had met with an accident just over a year before its release. The song has been used as the promo song for IPL 2016. The audio of the film's Tamil version was released on 1 May 2013 and the Malayalam version on 3 May 2013. The Tamil album was released at the audio launch held at Sathyam Cinemas in Chennai, which was launched by Anirudh Ravichander and Udhayanidhi Stalin, along the cast and crew. Video promos of the songs were released on 13 May 2013, in Malayalam and Tamil.
 
The album received positive reviews in both versions. Behindwoods rated the album 2.5 out of 5, stating "High adrenaline balanced by sweet melodies."  Milliblog reviewed the album as "Rajesh Murugesan makes a striking debut, even beyond Pistah!" Music Aloud gave a rating of 7.5/10, with "Thiruttu Isai Beethoven Resurrected", "Kaatru Veesum", "Pistah" as their favourite picks and gave a bottomline "Good to know that the hype around Pistah wasn’t for naught. Promising debut by Rajesh Murugesan, Neram." The Times of India gave a statement "The eclectic background score by Rajesh Murugesan adds pep to the movie, as does the use of "Pistah" in the action sequences." Vipin Nair of Therarefied reviewed the album stating "Rajesh Murugesan makes a noticeable debut with Neram."

Release 
The first look posters of the film was released on 21 February 2013. On 28 March 2013, Red Giant Movies, production house of Udhayanidhi Stalin acquired the film's distribution rights in Tamil Nadu, while the film was distributed in Kerala by Lal Jose, under his production house LJ Films. Trailers in both languages were released on 19 April 2013.

The Malayalam version was released on 10 May 2013, in 73 screens across Kerala, while the Tamil version was released on 17 May 2013 in 200 plus screens in Tamil Nadu.

The satellite rights of the film's Tamil version were sold to Sun TV and the rights of the film's Malayalam version was acquired by Mazhavil Manorama. AP International released the Malayalam version on Blu-ray, DVD and VCD on 1 August 2013.

Reception

Critical reception 
The film received positive reviews from critics.

Malayalam version 
Padmakumar K of Malayala Manorama rated the film 2.5 in a scale of 5 and said, "Though the concept is nothing new, the way of presentation and the setting is a merited deviation from the beaten track. The movie is watchable for some surprises it throws up now and then. There are some unseen extraordinary scenes and events not usually seen in Malayalam cinema." The reviewer praised the film's technical aspects, especially Alphonse Putharen's editing and direction, and Anand C. Chandran's camera works. He also praised the acting by Manoj K. Jayan, Simhaa, Shammi Thilakan and Nazriya Nazim while commenting that Pauly "still has to come out of his usual self". Sify.com's critic gave the verdict as "good" and said, "For a debut attempt with lots of fresh faces in its cast and crew, director Alphonse Putharen's Neram could leave you pleasantly surprised. With a rather okay script, the film scores with a brilliant narration, interesting performances, good visuals and peppy music." Aswin J Kumar of The Times of India rated the film 3.5 out of 5 and said, "Neram has a romantic charm, an exciting trait which infuses it with a good measure of likability." Rediff.com's Paresh C Palicha rated the film 2.5 out of 5 and said that "Neram has an interesting narrative but lacks on the humour quotient".

Tamil version 
Indo-Asian News Service (IANS) rated the film 4 in a scale of 5 and said, "There is absolutely nothing new about the story, yet what differentiates Neram from other films is its brilliant non-linear screenplay, never seen before in Tamil cinema. The film grows on you very gradually despite its brooding first half, but what follows post interval is top class and is worth every applaud or hoot that came its way." Baradwaj Rangan of The Hindu, while appreciating the film's narrative style and cinematography, commented, "Almost everything is perfect on paper. But something is lost on screen. We feel we should be laughing more, and that there are a few too many flat passages." Malini Mannath of The New Indian Express said that "the light, interesting narrative style and quirky characters makes it [the film] a pleasant one-time watch." N. Venkateswaran of The Times of India rated the film 3.5 in a scale of 5 and said, "Alphonse Putharen is a welcome addition to the new wave of Tamil film directors, and is a sign of the good times ahead for Indian cinema." Mythily Ramachandran of Gulf Times said, "Puthren joins the league of a growing number of young directors in Tamil and Malayalam who are making a mark with their fresh ideas and novel presentation. Neram is a delightful way to while away time." Shanmugan of Oneindia.in said, "Director Alphonse Putharen has created a working plot for Neram. Adding romantic charm and has come up with an enjoyable trait, which is infused with a good measure of likability." Sify.com's gave the verdict as "Good" and concluded the review saying, "Neram is genuinely a good attempt to make something unusual by a group of youngsters, which has to be encouraged."

Box office 
The film netted  from 73 screens in its opening weekend (10–12 May) in Kerala.

Awards and nominations

Remake 
Putharen has announced intentions for a Hindi remake to the film which he will direct. The film is remade in Telugu as Run starring Sundeep Kishan, Marathi as Time Bara Vait starring Bhushan Pradhan and in Kannada as Kismath (2018) starring Vijay Raghavendra.

Notes

References

External links
 

2013 films
Indian black comedy films
2010s comedy thriller films
2010s Malayalam-language films
Films scored by Rajesh Murugesan
2013 multilingual films
Indian comedy thriller films
Malayalam films remade in other languages
Tamil films remade in other languages
Features based on short films
2010s Tamil-language films
Indian multilingual films
Films set in Chennai
Films shot in Chennai
2013 directorial debut films
2013 black comedy films
Films directed by Alphonse Puthren